

Ceolmund (died  795) was a medieval Bishop of Hereford. He was consecrated between 786 and 788 and died between 793 and 798.

Notes

Citations

References

External links
 

Bishops of Hereford
8th-century English bishops
790s deaths
Year of birth unknown